Ihor Oleksandrovych Samoylenkoo (born 31 August 2002) is a Ukrainian professional footballer who plays as a defender for FC Chernihiv.

Career
Samoylenko is a product of the Desna Chernihiv system. He started his career at Desna-3 Chernihiv, the system's under-19 squad, where he made his debut against Dynamo Kyiv. Then he moved to Desna-2 Chernihiv, the system's under-21 squad.

FC Chernihiv 
In summer 2021, Ukrainian Second League side FC Chernihiv offered him a contract. On 24 July he made his debut for the new club against MFA Mukacheve, replacing Bohdan Lazarenko in the 46 minute. On 18 August he played in the 2021–22 Ukrainian Cup against Chaika Petropavlivska Borshchahivka, replacing Andriy Veresotskyi in the 35 minute and helping the team qualify for the third round for the first time in club history.

Career statistics

Club

References

External links
 
 

2001 births
Living people
Footballers from Chernihiv
Association football defenders
SDYuShOR Desna players
FC Desna-3 Chernihiv players
FC Desna-2 Chernihiv players
FC Chernihiv players
Ukrainian footballers
Ukrainian Second League players